The North West Region Waste Management Group (NWRWMG) is the collection of local authorities in the northwest of Northern Ireland responsible for municipal waste management services, including recycling. The local authorities include:

Ballymoney Borough Council
Coleraine Borough Council
Derry City Council
Limavady Borough Council
Magherafelt District Council
Moyle District Council
Strabane District Council

See also
ARC21
SWaMP

References

Waste disposal authorities